NA-91 Bhakkar-I is a constituency for the National Assembly of Pakistan.

Members of Parliament

1977: NA-62 Mianwali-III

1985: NA-62 Bhakkar

1988—2002: NA-55 Bhakkar-I

2002-2018: NA-73 Bhakkar-I

2018-2023: NA-97 Bhakkar-I

Election 2002 

General elections were held on 10 Oct 2002. Muhammad Sana Ullah Khan of PML-Q won by 95,131 votes.

Election 2008 

The result of general election 2008 in this constituency is given below.

Result 
Abdul Majeed Khan succeeded in the election 2008 and became the member of National Assembly.

Election 2013 

General elections were held on 11 May 2013. Abdul Majeed Khan of PML-N won by 97,688 votes and became the  member of National Assembly.

Election 2018 

General elections were held on 25 July 2018.

By-election 2023 
A by-election will be held on 16 March 2023 due to the resignation of Sana Ullah Khan, the previous MNA from this seat.

See also
NA-90 Mianwali-II
NA-92 Bhakkar-II

References

External links 
Election result's official website

NA-073